Abrit Nunatak, Trinity Peninsula
 Academia Peak, Livingston Island
 Acheron Lake, Livingston Island
 Afala Island, Nelson Island 
 Agalina Glacier, Danco Coast 
 Aglen Point, Livingston Island 
 Aheloy Nunatak, Livingston Island
 Ahrida Peak, Sentinel Range 
 Ahtopol Peak, Livingston Island 
 Akaga Glacier, Nordenskjöld Coast
 Akin Island, Nelson Island
 Akra Peninsula, Oscar II Coast
 Aktinia Beach, Snow Island
 Akula Island, Wilhelm Archipelago
 Alabak Island, Graham Coast
 Albatros Point, Trinity Island
 Albena Peninsula, Brabant Island
 Alcheh Island, Biscoe Islands
 Aldomir Ridge, Trinity Peninsula 
 Aleko Point, Livingston Island 
 Aleksandrov Peak, Graham Coast
 Aleksandrov Ridge, Alexander Island
 Aleksiev Glacier, Nordenskjöld Coast
 Alepu Rocks, Robert Island 
 Alfatar Peninsula, Robert Island 
 Alfeus Island, Smith Island 
 Alino Island, Biscoe Islands
 Alka Island, Trinity Island
 Altimir Glacier, Anvers Island 
 Altsek Nunatak, Greenwich Island 
 Aluzore Gap, Brabant Island
 Amadok Point, Livingston Island 
 Ami Boué Bluff, Trinity Peninsula 
 Anchialus Glacier, Sentinel Range
 Andreev Nunatak, Oscar II Coast
 Angelov Island, South Orkney Islands
 Antim Peak, Smith Island 
 Antonov Peak, Trinity Peninsula
 Apiaria Bight, Brabant Island 
 Aprilov Point, Greenwich Island
 Arapya Glacier, Sentinel Range 
 Arbanasi Nunatak, Livingston Island 
 Archar Peninsula, Greenwich Island 
 Arda Peak, Livingston Island 
 Argonavt Cove, Nelson Island
 Aripleri Passage, Trinity Peninsula 
 Aristotle Mountains, Oscar II Coast
 Arkovna Ridge, Oscar II Coast
 Arkutino Beach, Livingston Island 
 Armira Glacier, Smith Island 
 Armula Peak, Loubet Coast
 Arrowsmith Island, Biscoe Islands
 Arsela Peak, Sentinel Range
 Artanes Bay, Oscar II Coast
 Arzos Peak, Sentinel Range
 Asemus Beach, Robert Island 
 Asen Peak, Livingston Island
 Asparuh Peak, Livingston Island 
 Atanasoff Nunatak, Livingston Island
 Atanasov Ridge, Alexander Island 
 Atanasova Point, Livingston Island
 Atlantic Club Ridge, Livingston Island 
 Aurelia Island, Low Island
 Austa Ridge, Oscar II Coast
 Avitohol Point, Livingston Island 
 Avren Rocks, Robert Island 
 Avroleva Heights, Brabant Island
 Aytos Point, Livingston Island

See also 
 Bulgarian toponyms in Antarctica

External links 
 Bulgarian Antarctic Gazetteer
 SCAR Composite Gazetteer of Antarctica
 Antarctic Digital Database (ADD). Scale 1:250000 topographic map of Antarctica with place-name search.
 L. Ivanov. Bulgarian toponymic presence in Antarctica. Polar Week at the National Museum of Natural History in Sofia, 2–6 December 2019

Bibliography 
 J. Stewart. Antarctica: An Encyclopedia. Jefferson, N.C. and London: McFarland, 2011. 1771 pp.  
 L. Ivanov. Bulgarian Names in Antarctica. Sofia: Manfred Wörner Foundation, 2021. Second edition. 539 pp.  (in Bulgarian)
 G. Bakardzhieva. Bulgarian toponyms in Antarctica. Paisiy Hilendarski University of Plovdiv: Research Papers. Vol. 56, Book 1, Part A, 2018 – Languages and Literature, pp. 104-119 (in Bulgarian)
 L. Ivanov and N. Ivanova. Bulgarian names. In: The World of Antarctica. Generis Publishing, 2022. pp. 114-115. 

Antarctica
 
Names of places in Antarctica
Bulgarian toponyms in Antarctica